Barry Salter (1936 - 2007) was an Australian international lawn bowler.

Bowls career

World Championships
Salter won a silver medal in the fours with Don Woolnough, Leigh Bishop and Keith Poole in addition to a bronze medal in the team event (Leonard Trophy), at the 1976 World Outdoor Bowls Championship in Johannesburg.

State
He represented New South Wales in 227 Tests

References

1936 births
2007 deaths
Australian male bowls players